Al-Akrūf is a sub-district located in the Shar'ab as-Salam District, Taiz Governorate, Yemen. Al-Akrūf had a population of 7,551 according to the 2004 census.

Villages
Al-zahira village.
Al-muasis village.
Wadi Al-hajar village.
Al-quruduhah village.
Al-mudawrah village.

References

Sub-districts in Shar'ab as-Salam District